This is a list of schools in Blackpool, in the English county of Lancashire.

State-funded schools

Primary schools

Anchorsholme Primary Academy
Armfield Academy
Baines' Endowed CE Primary Academy
Bispham Endowed CE Primary School
Blackpool Gateway Academy
Blackpool St John's CE Primary School
Blackpool St Nicholas CE Primary School
Boundary Primary School
Christ the King RC Academy
Devonshire Primary Academy
Hawes Side Academy
Holy Family RC Primary School
Kincraig Primary School
Langdale Free School
Layton Primary School
Marton Primary Academy and Nursery
Mereside Primary Academy
Moor Park Primary School
Norbreck Primary Academy
Our Lady of the Assumption RC Primary School
Revoe Learning Academy
Roseacre Primary Academy
St Bernadette's RC Primary School
St Cuthbert's RC Academy
St John Vianney's RC Primary School
St Kentigern's RC Primary School
St Teresa's RC Primary School
Stanley Primary School
Thames Primary Academy
Unity Academy
Waterloo Primary Academy
Westcliff Primary Academy
Westminster Primary Academy

Secondary schools

Armfield Academy
Blackpool Aspire Academy
Highfield Leadership Academy
Montgomery Academy
St George's School
St Mary's Catholic Academy
South Shore Academy
Unity Academy Blackpool

Special and alternative schools
Educational Diversity
Highfurlong School
Lotus School
Park Community Academy
Woodlands School

Further education
Blackpool and The Fylde College
Blackpool Sixth Form College

Independent schools

Special and alternative schools
BFC School
Lancashire Alternative Provision
Spen Brook School
Tower Learning Centre

Blackpool
 
Schools In Blackpool